June Bernice Matilda Holst-Roness (June 10, 1929 – February 14, 2008) was a former mayor of Freetown, Sierra Leone under the APC government of Siaka Stevens. June Holst-Roness was the second female Mayor of Freetown. During her term the city was twinned with Hull, England.

Background
Dr. June Holst-Roness was born to Adjuah Spaine. She studied medicine at St. Andrews University in Scotland and it is there where she met her husband a Norwegian student, Rolv Holst-Roness.

June had a very successful career as a leading gynaecologist and obstetrician, was one of the first black women to be invited to visit China and also has a school named after her, the Dr. June Holst Roness Municipal School, for her contribution as Mayor as well as a doctor.

Sources
http://news.sl/drwebsite/publish/article_20057723.shtml
http://cocorioko.net/app/index.php?option=com_content&task=view&id=435&Itemid=1
http://www.peepsierraleone.com/news/templates/article.asp?articleid=158&zoneid=7
http://www.fssgukbranch.com/portfolio/mayor-june-holst-roness/

Sierra Leone Creole people
Alumni of the University of St Andrews
1929 births
2008 deaths